Streptomyces africanus is a bacterium species from the genus of Streptomyces which has been isolated from soil in Cape Town in South Africa.

See also 
 List of Streptomyces species

References

Further reading

External links
Type strain of Streptomyces africanus at BacDive -  the Bacterial Diversity Metadatabase

africanus
Bacteria described in 2004